Scout Car S1 (American) is an armoured car produced in Australia for the United States Army during the Second World War.

History and description
In 1942, the United States Army Air Forces (USAAF) in Australia issued a requirement for a light armoured car to be used in patrolling and airfield defence. The requirement resulted in a vehicle designated Scout Car S1 (American). About 40 vehicles were produced by Ford Australia.

The vehicle was based on a Ford F15 4x2 chassis (a single 4x4 vehicle was built). The open-topped armoured hull was similar to that of the M3 Scout Car. The armament consisted of one .50 inch (12.7 mm) heavy machine gun and two .30 inch machine guns on skate rails, operated by the crew of five.  

They served in defence of Australia and did not see any combat.

Survivors
As of late 2017, two S1 cars are known to be preserved: one restored at the Australian Armour and Artillery Museum, in Cairns, and another in a private collection.

Footnotes

References

Notes

Bibliography
 Michael K. Cecil - Australian Military Equipment Profiles vol. 3, Australian Scout and Armoured Cars 1933 to 1945, 1993 Australian Military Equipment Profiles, .

External links
Australian CMP Based Armoured Vehicles
Warwheels.net

World War II scout cars
World War II armoured fighting vehicles of Australia
Military vehicles introduced from 1940 to 1944